Frances Sanger Mossiker (April 9, 1906 – May 9, 1985) was an American writer best known for her historical novels.  Her works include Pocahontas: The Life and the Legend, The Queen's Necklace, and Madame de Sevigne.  Mossiker did not have her writing published until the age of fifty five.

Personal life
Frances Mossiker was born in Dallas, Texas on April 9, 1906.  She attended the Hockaday School. She was then a student at Smith College but not allowed to continue as a student after eloping with her first husband, Frank Beaston, at sixteen. She then went to Barnard College in New York, was Phi Beta Kappa in her junior year and graduated in 1927. She also studied at the Sorbonne in Paris, becoming fluent in French. Mossiker's first marriage lasted until 1929 and in October 1935 she remarried to Jake Mossiker. She eventually earned a Doctorate of Letters from Southern Methodist University in 1972. Mossiker lived in Dallas most of her life but spent much of her time traveling to Paris, London, and New York City. She remained in Texas until her death on May 9, 1985. She did not have any children.

Career
Mossiker began her career not as a writer but as a book reviewer for the Dallas Morning News in 1933. Her reviews of books were done on her own segment on KGKO Fort Worth, "Woman's World". She also did her book reviews for the Dallas Morning News. Aat the age of fifty five she began to write her own novels. Mossiker focused on historical fiction with a specialty in 17th and 18th century France. Mossiker often traveled to do research on her books.  In her lifetime Mossiker produced five novels.

Bibliography

The Queen's Necklace, 1961
Napoleon and Josephine, 1965
The Affair of the Poisons, 1969
More Than a Queen: The Story of Josephine Bonaparte, 1971
Pocahontas: The Life and the Legend, 1976
Madame de Sevigne: A Life and Letters, 1983

References

External links 
 
Frances Mossiker papers at the Sophia Smith Collection, Smith College Special Collections

1906 births
1985 deaths
20th-century American novelists
American historical novelists
American women novelists
Barnard College alumni
Novelists from Texas
The Dallas Morning News people
20th-century American women writers
Women historical novelists
Hockaday School alumni
American expatriates in France
Smith College alumni
University of Paris alumni